Soon-Yi Previn (born  October 8, 1970) is the wife of filmmaker Woody Allen. They have adopted two children together. 

Born in Korea, she is the adopted daughter of actress Mia Farrow and musician André Previn. According to Soon-Yi Previn and Allen, they began their relationship after he ended his 10-year affiliation with Farrow, when Previn was 21. In 1992, their relationship became national news.

Early life and education 
Soon-Yi Previn (original name Oh Soon-hee) was born in South Korea. She was found abandoned in Seoul on February 12, 1976, and placed temporarily in Maria's House, a local institution. When authorities failed to locate her parents or relatives, they placed her in St. Paul's Orphanage. The Seoul Family Court established a Family Census Register (legal birth document) on her behalf on December 28, 1976, with a presumptive birth date of October 8, 1970. A bone scan at the time of her adoption put her age at between five and seven. Previn has said that as a young child, she lived on the streets and got food out of trash cans.

In 1978, Farrow and her then husband, André Previn, adopted Soon-Yi and took her to the United States. At the time, U.S. law allowed two visas per family for international adoption. Her adoptive mother, Mia Farrow, asked her friends Rose and William Styron to have U.S. Representative Michael Harrington sponsor a private bill to enable the girl's adoption to the United States. This bill, HR 1552, was passed as Private Law 95-37 on May 15, 1978, paving Soon-Yi's way to immigrate to the United States. 

Just after the adoption, Farrow wrote to Nancy Sinatra about Soon-Yi, "Now she speaks English and is learning to read, write, play piano, dance ballet & ride a horse". Farrow later said that at the time of her adoption, Soon-Yi spoke no known language and had learning disabilities. Rose Styron is Soon-Yi's godmother.

Farrow's marriage to André Previn ended in 1979. She began a long-term relationship with filmmaker Woody Allen. Allen later adopted two of Farrow's adopted children: Dylan Farrow and Moses Farrow. In 1987, Mia Farrow gave birth to Ronan Farrow, who is Allen's biological son.

Soon-Yi Previn graduated from Marymount School of New York in 1991. After a summer as a salesgirl at Bergdorf Goodman, she began her freshman year as a commuter student at Drew University in Madison, New Jersey, in September 1991.

Previn graduated from Drew University and earned a master's degree in special education from Columbia University.

During her teens, Previn made an uncredited appearance in Allen's Hannah and Her Sisters (1986), which starred Farrow. She appeared as an extra in Paul Mazursky's 1991 film Scenes from a Mall, which starred Allen. She also appeared alongside Allen in the documentary Wild Man Blues (1997).

In 1992, Previn said that Farrow had physically abused her. In 2018, Previn's brother Moses Farrow has said that he too was physically abused by Farrow.

Relationship with Woody Allen 
Previn has said that Allen "was never any kind of father figure [to her]" and that she "never had any dealings with him" during her childhood. The findings of the judicial investigation carried out during the custody trial between Farrow and Allen determined that before 1990, Previn and Allen had rarely spoken to each other. According to Previn, her first friendly interaction with Allen took place when she was injured playing soccer during 11th grade and Allen offered to transport her to school. Following her injury, in 1990 Previn began attending New York Knicks basketball games with Allen.

In January 1992, Farrow found nude photographs of Previn in Allen's home. Allen, then 56, told Farrow that he had taken the photos the day before, approximately two weeks after he and Previn had first had sex. Farrow contends that she broke off her relationship with Allen in 1992 following her discovery of the affair. Previn and Allen dispute that, claiming that Allen and Farrow were no longer involved when Farrow discovered the photos.

Previn graduated from high school and began college in 1991. According to the birthdate the Seoul Family Court assigned her, she turned 21 in October 1991. The judicial investigation during the custody trial between Farrow and Allen concluded that Allen's and Previn's sexual relationship began in December 1991. Mia Farrow's friends have said it might have started in the spring or summer of 1991, before Soon-Yi turned 21.  

Allen described his relationship with Previn as a "fling" that developed into a more significant relationship. But in a 2018 interview Previn said, "From the first kiss I was a goner and loved him." On August 17, 1992, Allen issued a statement that he was in love with Previn.  Previn was surprised by his declaration: “I only knew that he loved me when he gave the press conference and said it publicly. Even then, I wasn’t sure if he meant it. We had never said those words to each other.”

When Previn's relationship with Allen became public, it was a catalyst for "tabloid headlines and late-night monologues in August 1992."

Personal life

Marriage and family

Previn and Allen married in Venice on December 22, 1997; she was 26 and he was 61. They have adopted two daughters together. According to her longtime friends, Previn has devoted herself to being a wife and stay-at-home mother. The Previn-Allen family resides on Manhattan's Upper East Side. 

As of 2021, Previn remains estranged from Mia Farrow.

Relationship with Jeffrey Epstein
She and Allen were photographed leaving sex offender Jeffrey Epstein's townhouse on multiple occasions. In 2013, they were also photographed taking a walk around Central Park before stopping at Epstein's mansion. This came after Epstein had pleaded guilty to child prostitution charges in 2008.

References 

1970 births
American adoptees
Drew University alumni
South Korean adoptees
Living people
People from Seoul
Previn family
Rider University alumni
South Korean emigrants to the United States
Teachers College, Columbia University alumni